Malahide (Canada 2016 Census population 9,292) is a municipal township in Elgin County in southwestern Ontario, Canada.

History
Malahide Township was named for Malahide Castle in Malahide, Ireland, birthplace of land grant administrator Colonel Thomas Talbot in 1810.  The village of Springfield was incorporated as a separate municipality in 1878.

The current municipality was formed in 1998 through an amalgamation of the original Township of Malahide, the former Township of South Dorchester and the former Village of Springfield.

The Ontario Police College is located in Malahide, at the site of the former Royal Canadian Air Force Station Aylmer, a training facility.

Communities
The township comprises the communities of Candyville, Crossley-Hunter, Copenhagen, Dunboyne, Fairview, Glencolin, Grovesend, Jaffa, Kingsmill, Lakeview, Little Aylmer, Luton, Lyons, Mile Corner, Mount Salem, Mount Vernon, Ormond Beach, Orwell, Port Bruce, Seville, Springfield, Summers Corners and Waneeta Beach.

Demographics 

See also
List of townships in Ontario

References

External links

Lower-tier municipalities in Ontario
Municipalities in Elgin County
Township municipalities in Ontario
Populated places established in 1810
1810 establishments in Canada